Play Me: The Complete Uni Studio Recordings...Plus! is a box set of Neil Diamond's recordings for Uni Records.
This anthology contains all of the tracks from:
 Velvet Gloves and Spit (1968)
 Brother Love's Travelling Salvation Show (1969)
 Touching You, Touching Me (1969)
 Tap Root Manuscript (1970)
 Stones (1971)
 Moods (1972)

The Plus! part of the collection contains live tracks from:
 Gold: Recorded Live at the Troubadour (1970)
 Hot August Night (MCA, 1972)

In addition to all of the album and bonus tracks, Play Me contains the CD debuts of Broad Old Woman (6 A.M. Insanity) (B-side of Two-Bit Manchild), and the live single version of "Cherry Cherry" from Hot August Night. It also contains the re-recorded version of Shilo, which was added to Velvet Gloves and Spit after its initial release, as well as the hit single Sweet Caroline, which started as a non-album single, but was later added to the album Brother Love's Travelling Salvation Show, which was then reissued as Sweet Caroline.

While this album can be said to contain every track from the studio albums, it does not contain every note. For whatever reason, Shilo is missing the opening note, while Stones is missing a couple of measures from the intro.

Track listing

References

Neil Diamond compilation albums
2002 compilation albums
MCA Records compilation albums
Albums arranged by Lee Holdridge
Albums conducted by Lee Holdridge
Albums produced by Tom Catalano
Albums arranged by Don Costa
Albums produced by Tommy Cogbill
Albums produced by Chips Moman
Albums recorded at the Troubadour
Albums arranged by Marty Paich
Albums conducted by Marty Paich
Albums arranged by Larry Muhoberac
Albums conducted by Larry Muhoberac
Albums recorded at the Greek Theatre (Los Angeles)